Derobrachus procerus is a species of beetle in the family Cerambycidae. It was described by Thomson in 1860.

References

Prioninae
Beetles described in 1860